South Dakota Highway 27 (SD 27) is a  state highway in Day and Marshall counties in  South Dakota, United States, that connects Pierpont, Langford, and Britton.

Route description

Day County
SD 27 begins at an intersection with U.S. Route 12 (US 12) southeast of Andover, in the central part of Day County. Here, the roadway continues to the south as 419th Avenue. SD 27 travels to the north, through rural areas of the county. North of 133th Street, it skirts along the western edge of the Pierpont Lake Recreation Area and passes Pierpont Lake. North of 131st Street, it intersects the western terminus of 1st Street, which is also signed as a "city truck route" and as "130 A Street". Just north of this intersection, the highway enters the southwestern part of Pierpont. An intersection with the western terminus of Main Street leads to the business district of the town. It skirts along the western edge of the Pierpont City Park. Just north of an intersection with the western terminus of 3rd Street, it leaves the city limits of Pierpont. At an intersection with the western terminus of 4th Street, it leaves the city park. Just south of 125th Street, the highway crosses over Antelope Creek. South of 124th Street, it curves to the north-northeast. At the intersection with 124th Street, it enters the southwestern part of Marshall County.

Marshall County
North of this intersection, SD 27 enters the southeastern part of Langford. At an intersection with the eastern terminus of Main Street, it turns right and travels to the east. East of Lesher Street, it leaves the city limits of Langford. East of 422nd Avenue, it curves back to the north. Just south of 119th Street, it passes Hickman Lake to the west. This intersection leads to access to Hickman Dam Lake. Just south of 112th Street, the highway crosses over Crow Creek. North of 111th Street, it enters the south-central part of Britton. Just south of 8th Street, it crosses over some railroad tracks of BNSF Railway. The next intersection is with SD 10 (Vander Horck). Here, SD 10 and SD 27 head concurrently to the east, while the Main Street name continues to the north. Just west of 7th Avenue, they cross over the railroad tracks of BNSF Railway from before. An intersection with 5th Avenue leads to Marshall County Healthcare Center. East of 3rd Avenue, they leave the city limits of Britton. At an intersection with 429th Avenue, the two highways split, with SD 27 resuming its path to the north. Between 109th Street and County Road 6 (CR 6; 108th Street), it crosses over Crow Creek again. From just south of 106th Street to south of CR 4 (104th Street), it passes White Lake to the west and crosses over White Rice Creek. CR 4 leads to Kidder and Veblen. North of the western terminus of CR 2 (101st Street), it curves to the north-northeast and meets its northern terminus, an intersection with the western terminus of CR 2G (100th Street) on the North Dakota state line. Here, the roadway continues to the north-northeast as North Dakota Highway 32 (ND 32).

National Highway System
No part of SD 27 is included as part of the National Highway System, a system of routes determined to be the most important for the nation's economy, mobility and defense.

History

The original SD 27 was established in 1926, from Olivet to Tabor. This became the southward extension of SD 35 between 1932 and 1935. SD 27 was established in 1976. It was the original northern part of the path of SD 25.

Major intersections

See also

 List of state highways in South Dakota

References

External links

 The Unofficial South Dakota Highways Page: Highways 1-30

0027
Transportation in Day County, South Dakota
Transportation in Marshall County, South Dakota